White Creek may refer to:

Places
White Creek, New York, a town in New York
White Creek, Wisconsin, an unincorporated community

Rivers
White Creek (Chattahoochee River), a stream in Tennessee
White Creek (Oriskany Creek tributary), a creek located in Oneida County, New York
White Creek (Otsego Lake), a creek located in New York that flows into Otsego Lake

See also
Whites Creek (disambiguation)